Mohican Brook is a creek in central Otsego County, New York. It flows into Otsego Lake north of Cooperstown, New York at Five Mile Point.

Mohican Brook flows through Mohican Canyon which is in The Deerslayer, as the "deep glen" in which the hostile Indians gather after overrunning Deerslayer, as he hides on the crest above while seeking to escape them. Most of this scene, however, takes place on and around Six Mile Point.

References

Rivers of New York (state)
Rivers of Otsego County, New York